Memories of Duke is an album by trumpeter Clark Terry performing compositions by, or associated with, Duke Ellington which was released on the Pablo Today label in 1980.

Reception

AllMusic's Scott Yanow noted "Terry knows these songs, which include "Cottontail," "Come Sunday" and "Sophisticated Lady," backwards, but he infuses each of his renditions with enthusiasm and melodic creativity. Recommended". The Penguin Guide to Jazz selected this album as part of its suggested Core Collection.

Track listing
All compositions by Duke Ellington, except where indicated.
 "Passion Flower" (Billy Strayhorn) - 4:27
 "Happy Go Lucky Local" - 4:28
 "Echoes of Harlem" - 4:01
 "Sophisticated Lady" (Ellington, Mitchell Parish, Irving Mills) - 8:27   
 "Things Ain't What They Used to Be" (Mercer Ellington, Ted Persons) - 5:05
 "I Let a Song Go Out of My Heart" (Ellington, Mills, Henry Nemo, John Redmond) - 3:28
 "Cotton Tail" - 2:16   
 "Everything but You" (Ellington, Don George, Harry James) - 7:51
 "Come Sunday" - 2:34

Personnel
Clark Terry - trumpet
Jack Wilson - piano
Joe Pass - guitar
Ray Brown - bass
Frank Severino - drums

References

1980 albums
Pablo Records albums
Clark Terry albums
Albums produced by Norman Granz
Duke Ellington tribute albums